Coastal Kadazan, also known as , is a dialect of the Kadazan Dusun language as well as a minority language primarily spoken in Sabah, Malaysia. It is the primary dialect spoken by the Kadazan people in the west coast of Sabah especially in the districts of Penampang, Papar and Membakut (sub-district of Beaufort).

Characteristics
The use of Coastal Kadazan has been declining due to the use of Malay by the Malaysian federal government and by the use of English by missionaries, which was done through the method of language shift enforced by the work of both the colonial and federal governments. The state of Sabah has introduced policies to prevent this decline, which is also happening to other native Sabahan languages. 
This included the policy of using Kadazan and other indigenous languages in public schools. Efforts have also been done to allow the language to become official in the state.

Coastal Kadazan has adopted many loanwords, particularly from other northern Borneo indigenous languages and also Malay. Kadazan extensively employs the voiced alveolar sibilant fricative  in their native lexicons, a feature found in only a few Austronesian languages. The Tsou and Paiwan languages also have these particular elements, spoken by the Taiwanese aborigines. Another language is Malagasy spoken in the island of Madagascar thousands of miles away off the coast of Africa.

Coastal Kadazan is highly mutually intelligible with Central Dusun and is considered by many to be the same language.

Under the efforts of the Kadazandusun Cultural Association Sabah, in 1995, the central Bundu-Liwan dialect (Central Dusun) was selected to serve as the basis for a standardised "Kadazandusun" language. This dialect was selected as it was deemed to be the most mutually intelligible when conversing with other "Dusun" or "Kadazan" dialects.

Phonology

Miller (1993) lists the following phonemes:

 ranges from weakly rounded to unrounded. Four borrowed consonants from Malay and English include .

Sample prayers

Our Father

Translation:
Our Father, who art in heaven, hallowed be thy name. Thy kingdom come, Thy will be done on earth as it is in heaven. Give us this day our daily bread, and forgive us our sins, as we forgive those who sin against us. Do not lead us into temptation, but deliver us from evil. Amen.

Hail Mary

Translation:
Hail Mary, full of grace, the Lord is with you. Blessed are you amongst women, and blessed is the fruit of thy womb, Jesus. Holy Mary, Mother of God, pray for us, sinners, now and at the hour of our death. Amen.

Austronesian languages comparison table

Below is a table of Kadazan and other Austronesian languages comparing thirteen words.

References

External links

 KadazanHomeland

Sabahan languages
Languages of Malaysia
Languages of Sabah
Verb–subject–object languages